Serretta Diane Wilson (born 8 September 1951, Fairfax, Virginia)  is an American-born British television and film actress.

She has played parts in Thriller (1975), The Zoo Gang, The Borgias, Jeeves and Wooster (1993), and London Bridge on television, and small roles in films such as Up the Chastity Belt (1972), Tower of Evil (1972), Our Miss Fred (1972), Psychomania (1973), Keep It Up Downstairs (1976) and Sweeney 2 (1978). In the Dad's Army episode "Getting the Bird" (1972), she appeared as Sergeant Wilson's estranged daughter. In the Space: 1999 episode Dorzak, Wilson plays the part of a refugee.

References

External links 

1951 births
Living people
British television actresses
British film actresses
People from Fairfax, Virginia